Lori Millin (born September 4, 1969) is a Democratic former member of the Wyoming House of Representatives, representing District 8 from 2007 to January 3, 2011.

She was unseated in the general election held on November 2, 2010, by the Republican Bob Nicholas.

External links
Wyoming State Legislature - Representative Lori Millin official WY Senate website
Project Vote Smart - Representative Lori Millin (WY) profile
Follow the Money - Lori Millin
2006 campaign contributions

Democratic Party members of the Wyoming House of Representatives
1969 births
Living people
Politicians from Aberdeen, South Dakota
Women state legislators in Wyoming
Politicians from Cheyenne, Wyoming
21st-century American women